Bouley was a contemporary French restaurant located at 163 Duane Street (between Greenwich Street and Hudson Street), in Tribeca in Manhattan, in New York City. The high-profile four-star chef David Bouley was its owner and chef. It initially opened in 1987 at 154 Duane Street and was closed in 1996.

It reopened at its second location in October 2008 and was there just short of nine years before closing in July 2017. Jackets were required for men, at both lunch and dinner.

Menu

The menu was modern French, and included dishes such as porcini flan with Dungeness crab and black truffle broth, wild salmon, and organic duckling.

Decor
The romantic, candle-lit restaurant had vaulted ceilings brushed with gold leaf, an ancient French fireplace, and Impressionist paintings.  A circular stone staircase led to a cellar for private parties.

Reviews
In 2013, Zagats gave it a food rating of 28, and ranked it the best of 111 restaurants in Tribeca, and the 3rd-best restaurant in New York City. In 2015, TripAdvisor rated it the best restaurant in the United States.

See also
 List of French restaurants

References

Bouley restaurant

External links

Quote by David Bouley

Restaurants in Manhattan
Defunct restaurants in New York City
Restaurants established in 2008
Tribeca
French-American culture in New York City
French restaurants in New York City
James Beard Foundation Award winners
2008 establishments in New York City
Restaurants disestablished in 2017
2017 disestablishments in New York (state)
Defunct French restaurants in the United States